Joseph Markell Foster (born November 3, 1984), professionally known as Joe Millionaire (also Joe Milli) is an international record producer from Atlanta, Georgia, where he currently resides.

Early life 

Foster was born in southwest Atlanta, Georgia on November 3, 1984 to a musical family. He was introduced to a plethora of instruments early in his life. He attended Douglass High School where he began to explore software that allowed him to create the sounds that he grew to love and experiment with such as MPC, Fruity Loops, Logic, and Studio One.

Foster was offered a full music scholarship to Tennessee State University, where he was able to mold and develop his skill set.

Career 

While still an undergraduate, Foster was given the opportunity to produce for Lil' Wayne's music group, Squad Up. This led to Foster making his mark and working with names such as Trinidad James, Iggy Azelia, TI, T-Pain, YFN Lucci, and 2 Chains. He even ventured into television production, producing for shows such as Toddlers & Tiaras aired on TLC, WWE (Main Event / SmackDown) aired on the USA network and First aired on MTV.

After graduating from Traveca Nazarene University, Foster had the opportunity to produce on an EXO album that sold over a million copies, making him a Platinum-selling producer. Foster and Exo later collaborated on another project, which reached the #1 spot on Billboards World Albums Chart.

Foster has established himself as a "one stop shop" for any artist or production. He knows how to play over 13 different instruments and has a basic knowledge of several different types of beat-making software.

Notable works 

Music Credits 

Television Credits

References

 http://respect-mag.com/2016/12/platinum-producer-joe-millionaire-spreads-audio-dope-around-globe/
 http://www.contentdope.com/2016/12/spotlight-joe-millionaire/
 http://www.jukeboxdc.com/2016/12/joe-millionaire-southern-producer-global-sound/
 http://www.theeverydayweekend.com/blog/8wuyerp1ylvavmia4oelshmlxlhwpi?rq=joe%20millionaire

1984 births
Living people